Shirley Waldemar Baker (1836 – 16 November 1903) was a Methodist missionary in Tonga. He was the founder of the Free Church of Tonga and enjoyed significant influence during the reign of George Tupou I, who made him prime minister.

Early life
Baker was born in London, England, to Jane (née Woolmer) and George Baker. He arrived in Melbourne in 1852 during the Victorian gold rush, as a stowaway. He subsequently worked on the goldfields as a farmhand, miner and apothecary's assistant. In 1855, Baker became a teacher at a Wesleyan school in Castlemaine. He married Elizabeth Powell in 1859.

Tonga
In 1860, Baker was ordained as a Wesleyan minister and went to Tonga as a missionary. He became head of the mission and was involved in the councils of King George Tupou I, who made him his prime minister in 1880. A disagreement arose with the Wesleyan authorities at Sydney in 1879, and Baker founded an independent body under the title of the "Free Church of Tonga". Some of the natives, however, were loyal to their original church and much strong feeling was aroused, which resulted with an attempt to shoot Baker in 1887. He escaped unhurt, but his son and daughter were both wounded. Six Tongans were executed for this crime, and many were deported to other islands. In 1888, the Rev. George Brown visited Tonga to inquire into the position and to endeavour to heal the breach between the two churches. He did not succeed, and his reports show that Baker was using his power to the disadvantage of those who were not adherents of the Free Church. In 1890, Sir John Bates Thurston visited Tonga and deported Baker at short notice to Auckland for being 'prejudicial to the peace and good order of the Western Pacific'.

Late life
Baker lived in Auckland for some years but suffered financial losses in the 1890s slump. Baker paid a short visit to Tonga in 1897, settled there again in 1900, and died there on 16 November 1903. His grave and monument still stand as a tourist attraction in Pangai on Lifuka, Haʻapai.

Baker's side of the case may be found in Mennell's Dictionary of Australasian Biography, published in 1892. An opposing view is in Basil Thomson's The Diversions of a Prime Minister, pp. 3 to 25. R. L. Stevenson, who called Baker "the defamed and much-accused man of Tonga" found him "highly interesting to speak to" (Vailima Letters, p. 41).

See also
 William Mariner's accounts of pre-Christian Tonga
 Rev Sioeli Nau, a Methodist minister
 Rev Dr James Egan Moulton 
 King George Tupou I

Notes

References 

1836 births
1903 deaths
Methodist missionaries in Tonga
History of Tonga
Prime Ministers of Tonga
Tongan people of British descent
People from Haʻapai
English emigrants to colonial Australia
Australian Methodist missionaries